Maggie Lim ( 5 January 1913 – November 1995) was a Singaporean physician and public health official. She was inducted into the Singapore Women's Hall of Fame posthumously, in 2014.

Early life 
Maggie Tan was born into a prominent family, the daughter of businessman Tan Kwee Swee, granddaughter of businessman Tan Kim Ching, and great-granddaughter of Chinese philanthropist Tan Tock Seng. She attended Raffles Girls' School, and later, by special arrangement, Raffles Boys' School. In 1930, she was the first Singaporean schoolgirl to win a Queen's Scholarship. (Her brother Tan Thoon Lip won the same scholarship the previous year.) She earned a medical degree at the London School of Medicine for Women and the Royal Free Hospital. She returned to Singapore in 1940.

Career 
During World War II, Lim was a camp doctor at Endau Settlement in Johor, supporting the Malayan Peoples' Anti-Japanese Army. After the war, Lim was an obstetrician and public health official in Singapore. She worked for the Singapore Municipal Health Department at the Prinsep Street Infant Welfare Clinic, especially on promoting birth control awareness, addressing childhood infectious diseases, and expanding maternal and child clinic access.

Lim was honorary medical officer of the Singapore Family Planning Association when it began in 1949. In early 1951, she was briefly detained with others, by the government, on charges of spreading Malayan Communist Party propaganda.  In 1963, she became head of the maternal and child welfare department in the Ministry of Health. She was president of the Family Planning and Population Board, and an advisor to the Midwives' Council. She served on the Singapore Hospitals Board, and was an officer of the Singapore Paediatric Society.

Later in her career, Lim was a professor of epidemiology and public health at the University of Hawai'i's East–West Center.  While in Hawai'i, she served as vice president of Hawaii Planned Parenthood.

Lim was a member of the Royal College of Surgeons and the Royal College of Physicians of London.

Personal life 
Maggie Tan married another Queen's Scholar, political activist Lim Hong Bee. They had two daughters, including Patricia Lin, who became a television presenter in Singapore and later a professor in California. Lim died in Claremont, California. She was posthumously inducted into the Singapore Women's Hall of Fame in 2014.

Singaporean playwright Stella Kon is Maggie Lim's grand-niece.

Tribute 

On 14 March 2022, Google celebrated Dr Maggie Lim with a doodle.

References

External links 

 Photographs of Maggie Lim, from National Heritage Board, Singapore.

1913 births
1995 deaths
Singaporean women
Singaporean public health doctors
Raffles Girls' Secondary School alumni
Queen's Scholars (British Malaya and Singapore)
Alumni of the London School of Medicine for Women
Physicians of the Royal Free Hospital
20th-century Singaporean physicians
Singaporean emigrants to the United States
Women public health doctors